Barybin is a Russian surname. Notable people with the surname include:

 Olexandr Mykolayovych Barybin (born 1951), a Ukrainian politician
 Andriy Mykolayovych Barybin (born 1965), a Soviet and Ukrainian Paralympian
 Konstantin Sergeyevich Barybin (1908–1994), a Soviet and Russian mathematician and educator

 Also
 Barybin, Kursk Oblast, a khoetor in Medvensky District of Kursk Oblast

Russian-language surnames